Venice/Venice is a 1992 American film written and directed by Henry Jaglom and starring Henry Jaglom, Nelly Alard, Melissa Leo, Suzanne Bertish, Daphna Kastner, David Duchovny, and John Landis.

Plot
Dean is an American film director whose most recent film has been chosen for the Venice Film Festival.  A beautiful French journalist arrives at the festival with the intention of interviewing the eccentric filmmaker and in the midst of the festival madness, she is forced to confront the wide divergence between things as they really are and things as they seem to be, both on screen and off. Shot in Venice, Italy and Venice, California, Venice/Venice looks at the effect movies have on our lives, loves and dreams.

Sources

https://www.rogerebert.com/reviews/venicevenice-1993
https://variety.com/1992/film/reviews/venice-venice-2-1200430400/

1992 films
Films shot in Venice
Films shot in Venice, Los Angeles
1992 drama films
American drama films
1990s English-language films
Films directed by Henry Jaglom
1990s American films